Igor Orlov may refer to:

 Igor Orlov (alias), code name for Soviet double agent Aleksander Kopatzky
 Yegor Orlov (born 1996), Russian ice-hockey player 
 Igor Orlov, Russian governor of Arkhangelsk Oblast